The Bedford Avenue station is a station on the BMT Canarsie Line of the New York City Subway. Located at the intersection of Bedford Avenue and North Seventh Street in Williamsburg, Brooklyn, it is served by the L train at all times. With an annual total of 9,388,289 passengers for 2015, Bedford Avenue is the busiest subway station in Brooklyn outside of Downtown Brooklyn, as well as the busiest station in Brooklyn served by one subway service.

History 

Bedford Avenue opened on June 30, 1924, as part of the initial segment of the underground Canarsie Line that originally stretched from Sixth Avenue station in Manhattan to Montrose Avenue station, built by the Brooklyn–Manhattan Transit Corporation (BMT) under the Dual Contracts.

As part of the wide scope in the rebuilding of the Canarsie Tubes that were damaged during Hurricane Sandy, the Metropolitan Transportation Authority started renovating the station in 2017. At the Bedford Avenue end of the station, two new street-level stairways were built, platform stair capacity was increased, the mezzanine was expanded, turnstiles were added, and new elevators were installed and opened on August 6, 2020. At the Driggs Avenue end, two new street-level stairways were added, the mezzanine area was redesigned with additional turnstiles installed, and a new platform stairway was built. Substantial completion was projected for November 2020, and MTA officials formally dedicated the new elevators and entrances that October.

Station layout

At platform level, Bedford Avenue utilizes a simple island platform setup with two tracks. The track normally used by southbound trains to Canarsie is labeled Q1, and the track normally used by northbound trains to Manhattan is labeled Q2. The Q- prefix denotes that the track is on the Canarsie Line, but this is only used by MTA officials and not by the general public.

The Bedford Avenue station's walls have a brown-and-green mosaic pattern with geometric shapes and embellished "B" ornamentation.

There are two mezzanines above the platform: one at Bedford Avenue on the west and one at Driggs Avenue on the east. Two stairs and an elevator rise from the west end of the platform to the Bedford Avenue mezzanine, while a stair from the east end of the platform rises to the Driggs Avenue mezzanine.

Exits

There are two sets of entrance and exit points. The western set comprises four street stairs: two stairs each to the southeastern and northeastern corners of Bedford Avenue and North 7th Street. It also comprises a 24-hour booth and an elevator to the northeastern corner of the intersection. The eastern exits are two stairs each to the southeastern and northeastern corners of North 7th Street and Driggs Avenue.

Some of these staircases are original to the station, while others were built as part of the 2019 expansion. The entrances built as part of the expansion are similar to those at Enhanced Station Initiative stations in other parts of the subway system, with next-train countdown clocks and neighborhood wayfinding maps at the exterior of the entrance. The new entrances contain a mural by Marcel Dzama entitled No Less Than Everything Comes Together, which depicts a sun and moon rising over fanciful figures.

Ridership
Bedford Avenue has experienced a surge in ridership along with the recent gentrification of Williamsburg. In the 1970s, the station had a fairly low annual ridership of 1.2 million, amounting to an average of 3,000 entries during weekdays. In 2000, there were 3.783 million boardings recorded at the station, but after the neighborhood was re-zoned in 2005, the MTA noted even higher ridership. By 2007, ridership had increased over 50%, to 5.776 million annual passengers. In 2008, Bedford Avenue was used by more than 6 million people, making it the 53rd most-used subway station in New York City and one of the busiest in Brooklyn. In ,  riders used this station.

Between 1998 and 2011, passenger numbers on the L increased three times as much as ridership on the subway system as a whole. As a result, by 2011, many Manhattan-bound L trains were running at their full capacity of 1,160 riders per train by the time they reached the Bedford Avenue station. In 2010, Bedford Avenue surpassed seven million entries for the first time in its history, receiving press for its particularly high weekend passenger volume. Crowding has become such an issue that politicians have called upon the MTA to "create a schedule that is more reflective of ridership patterns."

In popular culture
In the Netflix TV series Marvel's Daredevil, a scene in "Into the Ring" has Foggy Nelson meet with Sgt. Brett Mahoney outside the entrances to Bedford Avenue, with the signage on the stairwell altered to dress it up as 50th Street on the IND Eighth Avenue Line.

References

External links 

 
 Station Reporter – L Train
 The Subway Nut - Bedford Avenue Pictures
 Bedford Avenue entrance from Google Maps Street View
 Driggs Avenue entrance from Google Maps Street View
 Platform from Google Maps Street View

BMT Canarsie Line stations
New York City Subway stations in Brooklyn
Railway stations in the United States opened in 1924
Williamsburg, Brooklyn